Rock'N'Roll Show 2008 is the first live DVD by Japanese rock act Superfly. The two-disk box set features a recording of the NHK Hall stop on her Rock'N'Roll Show 2008 concert tour, a recording of a free concert held at Yoyogi Park, as well as Shiho Ochi's trip to San Francisco to become closer to her idol Janis Joplin by meeting with Sam Andrew and other members of Big Brother and the Holding Company. The DVD peaked at 16 on the Oricon's DVD charts, and remained on the charts for 19 weeks.

Track listing

References

External links
Rock'N'Roll Show 2008 at Supefly-Web.com

Superfly (band) albums
2009 video albums
Live albums by Japanese artists
Live video albums